"Blame It on My Youth" is a jazz standard written by Oscar Levant (music) and Edward Heyman (lyrics) in 1934.

Recorded versions

1934: The Dorsey Brothers Orchestra (vocal by Bob Crosby) - recorded for Decca Records (catalog 320) on November 15, 1934.
1935: Bing Crosby - first broadcast by Crosby on his radio show Bing Crosby Entertains on February 5, 1935.
1935: Jan Garber and His Orchestra (vocal by Lee Bennett) - a popular record on the Victor label.
1952: Gordon MacRae - a single release for Capitol Records.
1955: Rosemary Clooney - for her album While We're Young.
1957: Nat King Cole - After Midnight
1956: Chris Connor - This Is Chris
1956: Mabel Mercer - Midnight at Mabel Mercer's
1957: Frank Sinatra - Close to You
1958: André Previn and David Rose – Secret Songs for Young Lovers
1958: George Shearing - Burnished Brass (instrumental version)
1958  Connie Stevens - Conchetta
1959: Tammy Grimes - Tammy Grimes
1959: Connie Francis - The Exciting Connie Francis
1960: Hank Garland - Velvet Guitar (instrumental version)
1960: Jeri Southern - At the Crescendo
1961: Sammy Davis Jr. - The Wham of Sam
1961: Buddy Greco - Songs for Swinging Losers
1961: Ann-Margret - And Here She Is
1962: Vic Dana - Warm & Wild
1962: Julie London - Sophisticated Lady
1963: James Darren – "They Should Have Given You the Oscar" (Single B-side)
1964: John Davidson - The Young Warm Sound of John Davidson
1964: Carmen McRae - Second to None, Carmen's Gold (1971)
1964: Keely Smith - The Intimate Keely Smith
1965: Gloria Lynne - Intimate Moments
1969: The Golddiggers - The Golddiggers
1975: Charlie Byrd - Top Hat (instrumental version)
1981: Gary Burton Quartet - Easy as Pie (instrumental version)
1983: Keith Jarrett Trio - Standards Vol 2 (instrumental version)
1983: Art Farmer - Something Tasty (with Tommy Flanagan), Blame It on My Youth (1988) (instrumental versions)
1986: Michael Feinstein - Live at the Algonquin.
1989: Chet Baker - Chet Baker Sings and Plays from the Film "Let's Get Lost"
1991: Keith Jarrett Trio - The Cure (instrumental version)
1993: Holly Cole Trio - Don't Smoke in Bed
1993: David Silverman Trio - I Have Dreamed
1994: Karrin Allyson - Azure-Té
1994: Kenny Rankin - Professional Dreamer
1995: Lisa Ekdahl - When Did You Leave Heaven
1995: Fred Hersch & Jay Clayton - Beautiful Love
1995: Trine-Lise Væring - When I Close My Eyes
1997: Brad Mehldau - The Art of the Trio Volume One (Grammy Award nominated instrumental version)
1999: Keith Jarrett - The Melody at Night, with You (instrumental version)
2001: Michiel Borstlap - Gramercy Park (instrumental version)
2001: Kurt Elling - Flirting with Twilight
2001: Jane Monheit - Come Dream with Me
2001: Solveig Slettahjell - Slow Motion Orchestra
2001: Viktoria Tolstoy - Blame It on My Youth
2003: Aaron Neville - Nature Boy: The Standards Album
2004: Eden Atwood - This Is Always: The Ballad Session
2004: Jamie Cullum - Twentysomething
2004: Nancy Wilson - R.S.V.P. (Rare Songs, Very Personal)
2005: Steve Heckman Quartet - "Live at Yoshi's"
2005: The New Sound Quartet (Joe Locke, Geoffrey Keezer) - Summertime (instrumental version)
2008: Jennifer Leitham - "Left Coast Story"
2010: Ania Szarmach - Inna
2012: Nat Reeves - State of Emergency (instrumental version)
2012: Elisa Rodrigues - Heart Mouth Dialogues
2013: Paolo Fresu Devil Quartet - Desertico (instrumental version)
2014: Barry Manilow - for his album Night Songs
2017: Katharine McPhee - I Fall in Love Too Easily
2019: Petros Klampanis - Irrationalities

Film appearances
1995 Let It Be Me - sung by Frank Sinatra.
1999 Eyes Wide Shut - performed by Brad Mehldau.

References

1934 songs
Songs with lyrics by Edward Heyman
Nancy Wilson (jazz singer) songs
1930s jazz standards
Songs written by Oscar Levant